The Auckland snipe (Coenocorypha aucklandica aucklandica), also known as the Auckland Island snipe, is a small bird in the sandpiper family. It is the isolated nominate subspecies of the subantarctic snipe that is endemic to the Auckland Islands, a subantarctic island group south of New Zealand in the Southern Ocean.

Taxonomy and etymology
The Auckland snipe was first collected in 1840 both by Charles Wilkes’ United States Exploring Expedition, and James Ross’ Erebus and Terror Antarctic expedition, with the British specimens forming the basis for George Gray's 1844 description. The species name, and hence the subspecific epithet, refer to the type locality.

Description
The subspecies is generally similar to others in the genus, being a small, brown, cryptically patterned snipe with a long bill, short neck, tail and legs, and short, rounded wings. Females are slightly larger than males, weighing about 107 g compared with the males’ 82–94 g.

Distribution and habitat
The snipe is endemic to the Auckland Islands, which has a total surface area of 625 km2. However, it is no longer present on  main Auckland Island, but only on 100 km2 Adams Island, Enderby Island, and the much smaller Disappointment, Ewing, Figure of Eight, Rose, Ocean and Dundas Islands. It inhabits the islands’ tussock grasslands, Olearia forest, shrubland and herbfields.

Breeding
Breeding is seasonal, with a records of egg-laying from late September to early November with chicks present in November–December.  The typical clutch size is two. “Hakawai” aerial displays have been recorded.

Status and conservation
The population of the snipe is estimated at 20,000 birds. It has been classified as a range-restricted island endemic with a stable population.

References

Auckland snipe
Birds of the Auckland Islands
Auckland snipe
Auckland snipe